Apatani (Apa Tani, Tanw) is a Tani language, a branch of the Sino-Tibetan languages, spoken in India.

Classification
Post & Kanno (2013) and Macario (2015) notes that Apatani has various words that do not reconstruct to Proto-Tani, pointing to a possible non-Tani substratum in Apatani. Macario (2015) lists the following divergent Apatani forms that do not reconstruct to Proto-Tani.

Geographical distribution
In Lower Subansiri district, Arunachal Pradesh, Apatani is spoken in 7 villages in Ziro valley, namely Hong, Hari, Biilla, Dutta, Hija, Mudang-Tage, and Bamin Michi (Ethnologue).

Writing system
Like most endangered oral languages, Apatani did not have a standardized orthography, until recently, and there was some debate among the Apatanis on which script should be used to transcribe it. In view of this, Tanw Supuñ Dukuñ, the apex Tanii organization, recommended the constitution of the Apatani Language Development Committee (ALDC). The Apatani Cultural and Literary Society (ACLS) constituted the ALDC to recommend a writing system of the language. A year-long discussion and study by ALDC resulted in the recommendation of an alphabet based on Roman script. The recommendation was accepted by the ACLS and the administrative approval for its use was given by the Tanw Supuñ Dukuñ, or the Apatani Apex Council.

Apatani (Tanii) Language Development
Language development is gradual process and in case of Apatani (Tanii) Language the development has been unrestrained so far. Yet, Tanii (Apatani) People have been writing Tanii using English Alphabets. And what began as a means to communicate through writing has now grown into a writing system that has emerged as a simple and easy means of communication for Tanii people. Apatani (Tanii) People live at a beautiful tiny valley known to the world as Ziro, located at Central Arunachal Pradesh. The total indigenous population is merely around 60,000 strong but Apatanis (Tanii) are known for their fervor when it comes to preservation and promotion of their unique culture that they closely share with their surrounding Tribes belonging to same Tani Group.

Currently, there are some positive initiatives with regard to Tanii Language development. The most relevant ones are revision project by Popi Sarmin Society (the pioneer in Tanii Script development), Apatani-English Dictionaryand livingdictionaries"Talking Apatani Dictionary".There are some differences on usage of some basic symbols and their usage. However, these developments are positive sign and they are giving momentum to public awareness regarding the urgent need for Tanii Language Development and Preservation.

Orthography
Tanii words can be written meaningfully using English consonants and vowels "as is". Currently, the writing system is under rapid development and there are various proposals that has been put forward and active research work is ongoing. In the meantime, people may write using the system as proposed by the ALDC (Apatani Language Development Committee) or use the simplified system with minimum change and retaining English consonants, vowels and sounds. So far, the only government of Arunachal Pradesh approved Apatani Script ("order No.EDA.41/96-97 Pt. dated Itanagar the 2nd Nov, 2010") is developed by the Popi Sarmiň Society and KIIJE TANII AGUN CHINSA is being used for elementary third language studies at schools in Ziro.
As any language, Apatani or Tanii language is evolving while it interacts with various languages such as English, Hindi, Assamese, etc. and as such it may not be correct to conclude on any specific writing structure as of now. For Tanw language, it a work in progress.

References

External links
dictionary by P.T. Abraham
Dictionary of the Apatani Language by Pascal Bouchery
Tanw Aguñ *

Apatani Talking Dictionary *

Languages of Arunachal Pradesh
Tani languages
Endangered languages of India
Endangered Sino-Tibetan languages